Fosse/Verdon is an American biographical miniseries starring Sam Rockwell as director–choreographer Bob Fosse and Michelle Williams as actress and dancer Gwen Verdon. The series, which tells the story of the couple's troubled personal and professional relationship, is based on the biography Fosse by Sam Wasson. Norbert Leo Butz and Margaret Qualley are also featured as Paddy Chayefsky and Ann Reinking, respectively. It premiered in eight parts on April 9, 2019, on FX.

At the 71st Primetime Emmy Awards, Fosse/Verdon received seventeen nominations, including Outstanding Limited Series and acting nominations for Rockwell, Williams, and Qualley.
Williams received the Primetime Emmy Award for Outstanding Lead Actress in a Limited Series or Movie and the Golden Globe Award for Best Actress – Miniseries or Television Film at the 77th Golden Globe Awards. At the 26th Screen Actors Guild Awards, Rockwell and Williams both won at their respective categories.

Premise
Fosse/Verdon tells the story of the romantic and creative partnership between Bob Fosse and Gwen Verdon. Fosse was a filmmaker and one of theater's most influential choreographers and directors. Verdon was a critically acclaimed actress and Broadway dancer who won 4 Tony Awards.

The story of the entire series unfolds through back-and-forth flashes of the couple's relationship through the years. It includes the reversals of power and status as well as the contexts in which they happened. It also presents Fosse and Verdon's contributions to the entertainment industry.

Cast and characters

Main
 Sam Rockwell as Bob Fosse
 Justin Gazzillo as young Bob Fosse
 Michelle Williams as Gwen Verdon
 Kelli Berglund as young Gwen Verdon
 Norbert Leo Butz as Paddy Chayefsky, playwright, Bob's friend
 Margaret Qualley as Ann Reinking, actress-dancer

Recurring

 Aya Cash as Joan Simon, Neil's first wife
 Evan Handler as Hal Prince, director
 Nate Corddry as Neil Simon, playwright, Bob's friend
 Susan Misner as Joan McCracken, Bob's second wife
 Paul Reiser as Cy Feuer, producer
 Blake Baumgartner and Juliet Brett as Nicole Fosse
 Chandler Head as Young Nicole
 Jake Lacy as Ron, Gwen's lover
 Kelli Barrett as Liza Minnelli, actress
 Bianca Marroquín as Chita Rivera, actress
 Ethan Slater as Joel Grey, actor
 Rick Holmes as Fred Weaver, Bob's first manager
 Peter Scolari as Mel, Gwen's manager
 Christiane Seidel as Hannah, German interpreter
 Byron Jennings as George Abbott, director
 Laura Osnes as Shirley MacLaine, actress
 Brandon Uranowitz as Dustin Hoffman, actor
 Tyler Hanes as Jerry Orbach, actor
 Wayne Wilcox as Michael Kidd, choreographer
 Lindsay Nicole Chambers as Leland Palmer, actress
 Santino Fontana as James Henaghan, Gwen's first husband
 Emily Dorsch as Gertrude Verdon, Gwen's mother
 Christopher Tocco as Jack Cole, choreographer
 Kelcy Griffin as Debbie Allen, actress
 Pamela Mitchell as Marsha Mason, actress
 Rema Webb as Paula Kelly, actress
 Spencer Moss as Mary Ann Fosse, Bob's sister
 David Turner as Ray Walston, actor
 George Bamford as Robert Surtees, cinematographer
 George R. Sheffey as David Bretherton, editor
 Jimmy Brewer as Stephen Schwartz, songwriter
 Tim Young as John Rubinstein, actor
 Peggy J. Scott as Irene Ryan, actress
 Sean Patrick Doyle as Michael O'Haughey, actor
 Ryan Vandenboom as Eddie Phillips, choreographer
 Anthony Rosenthal as Charlie Grass, choreographer
 Nicholas Baroudi as Scott Brady, actor 
 Jeremy Shamos as Joseph Hardy, director
 Ahmad Simmons as Ben Vereen, actor
 Lin-Manuel Miranda as Roy Scheider, actor

Episodes

Music 
Fosse/Verdon released weekly albums, available for streaming and download on multiple platforms, with the release of each new episode. In addition to original music, the soundtracks feature the cast singing popular songs from Bob Fosse and Gwen Verdon's various careers, including "Big Spender" from Sweet Charity and "Corner of the Sky" from Pippin.

Production

Development
The rights to produce a limited-series based on Sam Wasson's biography Fosse were sold to FX Network by executive producer George Stelzner.  In the summer of 2016, with the approval of FX creative executives, Stelzner pursued actor/writer Lin-Manuel Miranda and director Thomas Kail, of Hamilton, to join the project. Both Miranda and Kail were familiar with the Wasson biography as Miranda and Wasson were classmates at Wesleyan University years earlier. Tony Award-winning writer Steven Levenson (Dear Evan Hansen) was next to join the production team. Levenson and Kail would go on to earn the WGA credit designation of "developed for television by" for the limited-series.  During the early stages of the development process, the two were instrumental in attracting the participation of Nicole Fosse, the only child of Bob and Gwen and the executor of the Fosse/Verdon estate.

On July 5, 2018, FX announced an eight-episode order for a limited-series entitled Fosse/Verdon, with Sam Rockwell playing the role of Bob Fosse and Michelle Williams playing Gwen Verdon.  On October 25, 2018, it was reported that Kail would direct at least four of the series' eight episodes. and he would go on to direct a total of five episodes. Executive producers included Levenson, Kail, Miranda, Stelzner, Rockwell and Williams, with Nicole Fosse as a co-executive producer, and choreographer Andy Blankenbuehler (Hamilton) as co-producer.  On October 26, 2018, it was announced that Joel Fields, the showrunner of the acclaimed FX Network drama series The Americans would join the Fosse/Verdon production as an additional writer and executive producer. On January 23, 2019, the premiere date of April 9, 2019 was announced.

Casting
Alongside the series order announcement, it was confirmed that Rockwell and Williams had been cast as the leads. On November 19, 2018, it was announced Margaret Qualley and Norbert Leo Butz had been cast in series regular roles and that Aya Cash, Nate Corddry, Susan Misner, Bianca Marroquín, Kelli Barrett, Evan Handler, Rick Holmes, Paul Reiser, Ethan Slater, Byron Jennings, and Laura Osnes had joined the cast in a recurring capacity.

Qualley consulted heavily with Reinking on her performance, with the two holding chats twice a week for the duration of the shoot. Reinking was not a consultant on the series but praised the performances of Rockwell and Williams, though she was conflicted about the portrayal of Fosse as an abusive partner.

Filming
Principal photography for the series commenced in late October 2018 in New York City at Silvercup Studios, and lasted until late March 2019.

Release
On January 6, 2019, a teaser trailer for the series was released. In the United Kingdom, the BBC picked up the rights and the show premiered on BBC Two.

Reception

Critical response
On the review aggregator Rotten Tomatoes, the series holds an approval rating of 81% based on 88 reviews, and an average rating of 7.12/10. The website's critical consensus reads, "Sam Rockwell and Michelle Williams give viewers plenty of razzle and dazzle in Fosse/Verdon - a straightforward miniseries that is hampered by rote biographical tropes, but still shimmies with the requisite glitz, grit, and all that jazz audiences crave." Metacritic, which uses a weighted average, assigned the series a score of 68 out of 100, based on 34 critics, indicating "generally favorable reviews".

Ratings

Awards and nominations

References

External links

 – official site

2010s American drama television miniseries
2019 American television series debuts
2019 American television series endings
American biographical series
FX Networks original programming
Television shows based on biographies
Television series about show business
Television series by 20th Century Fox Television
Biographical films about entertainers